DPG may refer to
 Defense Planning Guidance provides basis for the U.S. National Military Strategy
 Democratic Party of Georgia an affiliate of the Democratic Party in the state of Georgia
 Diplomatic Protection Group is a branch of the London Metropolitan Police
 Deutsche Physikalische Gesellschaft - German Physical Society
 Deutsche Phytomedizinische Gesellschaft -  German Phytomedicine Society
 Deutsche Postgewerkschaft - former German trade union
 Tha Dogg Pound (Dogg Pound Gangstaz), a gangsta rap group
 DPG Media, a Belgian multinational media company
 D.P.G. Recordz, a record label
 Dugway Proving Ground, a US Army chemical and biological testing facility
 Dulwich Picture Gallery, London, UK
 A chemical mixture dipropylene glycol, used in industry
 A metabolite 1,3-bisphosphoglycerate in glycolysis
 A chemical 2,3-Bisphosphoglycerate (2,3-diphosphoglycerate), involved in hemoglobin-oxygen binding
 Dihydroxyphenylglycine, an amino acid
 Digital pair gain, a telecommunications term for delivering multiple phone lines over a single copper pair
 An abbreviation for doubleplusgood, Orwellian neologism for excellent
 Deck-type Plate Girder, a construction method for bridges